Porphyrocrinus is a genus of crinoids within the family Phrynocrinidae. Members of this genus have been found from 2103 to 4240 meters below sea level.

Species 

 Porphyrocrinus daniellalevyae 
 Porphyrocrinus incrassatus 
 Porphyrocrinus thalassae 
 Porphyrocrinus verrucosus

References 

Crinoid genera
Bourgueticrinida